Robert Steel Smith (April 10, 1936 – March 16, 2013), professionally known as Bobby Smith, also spelled Bobbie,  was an American R&B singer notable as the principal lead singer of the classic Motown/Philly group, The Spinners (also known as the Detroit Spinners or the Motown Spinners), throughout its history. The group was formed circa 1954 at Ferndale High School in Ferndale, Michigan, just north of the Detroit border. The group had their first record deal when they signed with Tri-Phi Records in early 1961.

Smith had been the group's lead singer since its inception, having sung lead vocals on The Spinners first hit record in 1961, "That's What Girls Are Made For" (which has been inaccurately credited to the group's mentor and former Moonglows lead singer, the late Harvey Fuqua). Smith also sang lead on most of their Motown material during the 1960s, such as the charting singles like "Truly Yours" (1966) and "I'll Always Love You" (1965); almost all of the group's pre-Motown material on Fuqua's Tri-Phi Records label, and also on The Spinners' biggest Atlantic Records hits. These included  "I'll Be Around", "Could It Be I'm Falling in Love", "They Just Can't Stop It the (Games People Play)".  In 1974, they scored their only #1 Pop hit with "Then Came You" (sung by Smith, in collaboration with superstar Dionne Warwick). All four of these Bobby Smith-led songs were Certified Gold by the R.I.A.A.  Despite the fact that Smith led on many of the group's biggest hits, many have erroneously credited most of the group's success to its other lead singer, the late Philippé Wynne, who did not join The Spinners until well over a decade after they had formed. (Henry Fambrough also sang lead on some of the Spinners' songs.) The confusion between Smith and Wynne may be due to the similarities in their voices and the fact that they frequently shared lead vocals on many of those hits.

In fact, Wynne was many times inaccurately credited for songs that Smith actually sang lead on, such as by the group's label, Atlantic Records, on their Anthology double album collection (an error corrected in the group's later triple CD set, The Chrome Collection). Throughout a succession of lead singers (G. C. Cameron, Wynne, John Edwards, etc.), Smith's lead voice had always been The Spinners' mainstay.

Smith battled lung cancer, and died of pneumonia and influenza on March 16, 2013, at the age of 76.

With the deaths of fellow Spinners members C. P. Spencer in 2004, Billy Henderson in 2007, and Pervis Jackson in 2008, Henry Fambrough is the only surviving original member of the group and is still performing with a current-day line-up of Spinners.

References

Bibliography
Romanski, Patricia and Holly George-Warren (editors). The Rolling Stone Encyclopedia of Rock & Roll. New York, NY: Fireside, 2005.

External links
 Bobbie Smith interview by Pete Lewis, 'Blues & Soul' February 2009
 Some comments from Bobbie Smith for Soul Express

1936 births
2013 deaths
American rhythm and blues singers
Motown artists
Musicians from Detroit
The Spinners (American group) members
20th-century African-American male singers
21st-century African-American male singers